Roshi may refer to:

Rōshi, a Japanese honorific title

Food
Roshi in Dhivehi (Maldivian language) refers to bread or roti

People
Kyozan Joshu Sasaki, also known as Joshu Sasaki Roshi, and referred to simply as "Roshi" by his followers
Odise Roshi (born 1991), Albanian international footballer

Fictional characters
Master Roshi, a Dragon Ball character